Kauaiina rubropulverula is a moth of the family Geometridae first described by Jules C. E. Riotte in 1989. It is endemic to Hawaii.

References

Larentiinae
Endemic moths of Hawaii
Moths described in 1989